Davis Corner or Davis Corners may refer to:

Davis Corner, Virginia Beach, Virginia, Princess Anne County, Virginia
Davis Corners, Ontario
Davis Corners, Wisconsin